The 1916–17 season was Manchester United's second season in the non-competitive War League.

With the ongoing First World War, once again Manchester United played non-competitive war league football. In the principal tournament they contested the Lancashire Section, which was expanded to 16 teams to give a more complete 30-game season. In the subsidiary tournament they contested Group D of the Lancashire Section, with the groups reduced to four teams in size to complement the increased playing season of the Principal Tournament. However, none of these were considered to be competitive football, and thus their records are not recognised by the Football League.

On 8 August 1916, while fighting in France during the war, former United player Private Oscar Linkson went missing in the battle to seize Guillemont Station during the Battle of the Somme. His body was never recovered and he was recorded as missing presumed dead.

On 3 May 1917, Another United former player Sandy Turnbull was killed in France. Turnbull was killed in Arras while serving as a Lance Sergeant in the Eighth Battalion of the East Surrey Regiment of the British Army. His body was never found and he is commemorated on the Arras memorial.

Lancashire Section Principal Tournament

Lancashire Section Subsidiary Tournament Group D

References

Manchester United F.C. seasons
Manchester United